Raimo Sakari Tuomainen (born 25 November 1957 in Nilsiä, Finland) is a Finnish health sociologist and one of the authorities in so called Kuopio discipline, which emphasizes the need to control the expansion of medicalization in Western countries. His publications deal also with religion, science, demography and health care administration. He works at Kuopio University Hospital.

Tuomainen has a political career, too. He has been a vice-chairman in the party council of Finnish Green League and a city counsellor in Kuopio. His ideological interests are especially in social ethics and social fairness. He underlines the meaning of social climate in human being's welfare.  Tuomainen has presented the term ”green feminism”, which means that people should get rid of strict male and female roles and the society should purposefully promote that.

Tuomainen has published some poetry and is a juryman of long standing in Finnish judicial system.

Tuomainen has eight children. He married a Nepali wife in 2011.

References
http://www.raimotuomainen.fi/
 :fi:Raimo Tuomainen
http://www.raimotuomainen.fi/medicalization.htm Public site concerning medicalization (by Markku Myllykangas and Raimo Tuomainen, Kuopio, Finland)

1957 births
Finnish feminists
Finnish sociologists
Living people
Male feminists
People from Nilsiä